Kalabhavan Navas is an Indian stage, television, and film actor, singer, comedian, and mimicry artist.introduced to films by veteran director Balukiriyath in the film mimics action 500, along with 38 mimicry artists He is known for his roles in television and films,  such as Hitler Brothers (1997), Junior Mandrake (1997), Mattupetti Machan (1998), Chandamama (1999) and Thillana Thillana (2003).

Career

He used to do many mimicry stage shows. He was in Kalabhavan mimicry troop. Later he started doing many mimicry shows along with his brother, Niyas Backer, under the banner Cochin Arts. He debuted as an actor in the feature film Chaithanyam in 1995. He has mostly played comic roles in films.

Family
His late father, Aboobacker was also an actor and theatre artist who is known for his roles in films such as Keli (1991), and Vatsalyam (1993). His brother, Niyas Backer, is also a well-known actor and comedian.
He married actress Rehana Navas in 2002.

Filmography

Television
As Host
Badai Bungalow 
Rani Maharani
As Judge
Comedy Masters 
Comedy Stars Season 2
Thakarppan Comedy
Himself as Guest
Cinema Chirima
Onnum Onnum Moonu
Manam Pole Mangalyam
Komedy Circus
Star Ragging
Idavelayil
TV serials
Veedu
Bhagyanakshatram

References

External links
 

Living people
People from Kerala
Indian male actors
Indian male singers
Indian male comedians
Year of birth missing (living people)
21st-century Indian actors
People from Thrissur
Male actors from Thrissur